This is a list of Superfund sites in Florida designated under the Comprehensive Environmental Response, Compensation, and Liability Act (CERCLA) environmental law.  The CERCLA federal law of 1980 authorized the United States Environmental Protection Agency (EPA) to create a list of polluted locations requiring a long-term response to clean up hazardous material contaminations.   These locations are known as Superfund sites, and are placed on the National Priorities List (NPL).  

The NPL guides the EPA in "determining which sites warrant further investigation" for environmental remediation.  As of May 3, 2010, there were 52 Superfund sites on the National Priorities List in Florida.  Three more sites have been proposed for entry on the list and 23 others have been cleaned up and removed from it.  There are also twelve Superfund Alternative sites in the state.

Superfund sites

See also
Environmental issues in Florida
List of Superfund sites in the United States
List of environmental issues
List of waste types
TOXMAP

External links
EPA list of proposed Superfund sites in Florida
EPA list of current Superfund sites in Florida
EPA list of Superfund site construction completions in Florida
EPA list of partially deleted Superfund sites in Florida
EPA list of deleted Superfund sites in Florida

References

Florida
Superfund
Environmental issues in Florida